Darius Dimavičius (born April 8, 1968) is a retired Lithuanian professional basketball player, who won the bronze medal with the Lithuania national basketball team at the 1992 Summer Olympics in Barcelona, Spain.

References
 databaseOlympics

1968 births
Living people
Basketball players at the 1992 Summer Olympics
BC Rytas players
BC Prievidza players
BC Žalgiris players
Gymnastikos S. Larissas B.C. players
Utsunomiya Brex coaches
Lithuanian men's basketball players
LSU-Atletas basketball players
Medalists at the 1992 Summer Olympics
Olympic basketball players of Lithuania
Olympic bronze medalists for Lithuania
Olympic medalists in basketball
Soviet men's basketball players
Swans Gmunden players
Power forwards (basketball)
Basketball players from Kaunas